Hopewell is an unincorporated community in eastern Washington County, Missouri, United States. The community lies on Hopewell Creek, south of Summit and Missouri Route 8.

History
Hopewell was originally called "Hopewell Furnace", and under the latter name was platted in 1858, and named after a nearby blast furnace of the same name. A post office called Hopewell Furnace was established in 1855, the name was changed to Hopewell in 1886, and the post office closed in 1978.

Gallery

References

Unincorporated communities in Washington County, Missouri
Unincorporated communities in Missouri